Belliella buryatensis  is a Gram-negative and non-motile bacterium from the genus of Belliella which has been isolated from alkaline lake water from the Lake Solenoe in Buryatia in Russia.

References

External links
Type strain of Belliella buryatensis at BacDive -  the Bacterial Diversity Metadatabase

Cytophagia
Bacteria described in 2016